Nadia Crow is an American television news reporter. In June 2013 she began working at KTVX-TV Channel 4 in Salt Lake City, Utah, the first African-American to be a primary anchor in that state.

Biography
Nadia Crow was born in Fort Worth, TX. Her family later moved to Chicago, where she was raised. She attended Syracuse University, graduating from its prestigious S.I. Newhouse School of Public Communications. After graduation she worked for WSJV channel 28 in Elkhart, Indiana, then moved to Cedar Rapids, Iowa in 2010, where she was a news anchor for KCRG-TV for three years. In 2013 she was hired by Utah's Channel 4 news director George Severson, initially to co-anchor the 4 p.m. newscast, to anchor the 10-minute newscast weeknights on sister station KUCW Channel 30, and to provide field reports. In July 2016, Nadia Crow joined KCPQ, Seattle Washington's Fox affiliate as an anchor and reporter.

References

External links

Living people
Television anchors from Salt Lake City
People from Norfolk, Virginia
Journalists from Virginia
Year of birth missing (living people)